Hillsboro is an unincorporated community in King and Queen County, Virginia, United States.

References

Unincorporated communities in Virginia
Unincorporated communities in King and Queen County, Virginia